KELD-FM (106.5 MHz) is a radio station licensed to Hampton, Arkansas, United States, the station serves the El Dorado area.  The station is currently owned by Noalmark Broadcasting Corporation.

History
On March 1, 2017 KELD-FM changed the format from talk to adult hits, branded as "106.5 The Planet". (into taken from stationintel.com) On March 5, 2019 KELD rebranded as "Max 106.5" and the format changed to Top 40 (CHR).

Previous logo

References

External links

ELD-FM
Noalmark Broadcasting Corporation radio stations
Radio stations established in 1984
1984 establishments in Arkansas
Hampton, Arkansas
Contemporary hit radio stations in the United States